The Board of Control for Cricket in India (BCCI), is the national governing body of Cricket in India, its headquarter is situated at Cricket centre near Wankhede Stadium in Mumbai. The BCCI is the richest cricket governing body in the world and is part of the "Big Three" of international cricket, along with Cricket Australia and the England and Wales Cricket Board.

Grant Govan was the first BCCI president and Anthony De Mello was its first secretary. , Roger Binny is the incumbent BCCI president and Jay Shah is secretary. The board joined the Imperial Cricket Conference in 1926. The BCCI is an autonomous, private organisation that does not fall under the purview of the National Sports Federation of India and the Government of India has minimal regulation of it. The BCCI is influential in international cricket. As such, it does not receive any grants or funds from the Ministry of Sports.

The BCCI manages four squads that represent India in international cricket; the men's national cricket team, the women's national cricket team, the men's national under-19 cricket team  and women's national under-19 cricket team. It also governs the developmental India A and India B teams. Its national selection committee, which is led by chief national selector, selects players for these teams. As part of its duties, the BCCI organises and schedules matches to be played by each of these teams, and schedules, sanctions and organises domestic cricket in India.

The BCCI has hosted multiple ICC World Cups, and will host the 2023 Cricket World Cup, the 2026 ICC T20 World cup, the 2031 ICC ODI Cricket World Cup, and the 2025 Women's Cricket World Cup.

History 

The first game of cricket was played in India by European sailors, who played the sport as a recreational activity in the first half of the 18th century. These sailors played cricket near their coastal settlements. The first recorded match in India was played between the British army and British settlers in 1751. The world's second-oldest cricket club, Calcutta Cricket Club, was founded in 1792 in present-day Kolkata. The Parsis were the first civilian community to accept cricket as a sport and play it in India. In 1848, they set up the Oriental Cricket Club in present-day Mumbai. In 1850, they founded the Young Zoroastrian Cricket Club. In 1886, the Hindu Gymkhana sports club was founded.

In 1912, an all-India cricket team visited England for the first time, and were sponsored and captained by the Maharaja of Patiala. In 1926, two representatives of Calcutta Cricket Club travelled to London to attend meetings of the Imperial Cricket Conference, the predecessor of the current International Cricket Council. Although technically not an official representative of Indian cricket, they were allowed to attend by Lord Harris, chairman of the conference. The outcome of the meeting was the MCC's decision to send a team that was led by Arthur Gilligan, who had captained England in The Ashes, to India.

Founding and early years

In a meeting with the Maharaja of Patiala and others, Gilligan promised to press for its inclusion in the ICC if all of the game's promoters in the country united to establish a single controlling body. An assurance was given and on 21 November 1927 a meeting was held in Delhi, which was attended by delegates from Patiala, Delhi, United Provinces of Agra and Oudh, Rajputana, Alwar, Bhopal, Gwalior, Baroda, Kathiawar, Central Provinces and Berar, Sindh and Punjab. The delegates agreed to create a board for control of cricket in India. On 10 December 1927, a unanimous decision to form a provisional board of control was taken, and the BCCI was formed in December 1928. R. E. Grant Govan was elected as its first president and Anthony de Mello was secretary.

In 1926, the BCCI joined the Imperial Cricket Council, then the governing body for international cricket. In 1936, the BCCI started India's premier first-class cricket championship the Ranji Trophy, which was named after the first Indian person who played international cricket, the King of Nawanagar state K.S. Ranjitsinhji, who played for England in international cricket. The Mumbai cricket team is the most-successful team, winning 41 titles.

In 1932, India played its maiden Test match under the captaincy of CK Naidu against England at Lord's cricket ground in London. During England's 1933-34 tour of India, on 17 December 1933, Lala Amarnath became the first Indian batsman to score a test century, scoring 118 on his debut, at Bombay Gymkhana. In 1967–68, India won its first-ever Test cricket series outside Asia. Previously it had defeated Pakistan, New Zealand and England, and won series in India.

1945–1987
 

In 1952, the England team toured India; it was their first tour of India after its Independence. Nigel Howard was the captain of touring team. The former India captain Vijaya Ananda Gajapathi Raju, also known as Vizzy, was the BCCI president in the 1960s.

Banks, Indian railways and private enterprises would recruit players.

The board appointed Ajit Wadekar captain. in 1971, the Indian team won their first test series against England on English soil, and against the West Indies. Sunil Gavaskar made his test debut.

India won the 1983 Cricket World Cup, defeating the defending champions the West Indies by 43 runs in the final at Lord's. India also won the World Championship of Cricket in 1985, defeating Pakistan by eight wickets in the final at Melbourne Cricket Ground. The BCCI hosted the 1987 World Cup; it was the first time the event was organised outside England.

1987–2000

It hosted the ICC Cricket World Cup competitions in 1987 and 1996.

In 1991, BCCI proposed South Africa's readmission to international cricket at the International Cricket Council (ICC). After the proposal succeeded, the BCCI sold television broadcast rights for the first time; South African Broadcasting Corporation purchased the rights to broadcast the South African cricket tour of India, South Africa's first official international tour after the 21-year boycott from international cricket. During this time, South Africa joined the "Asian bloc" of the BCCI and its South-Asian neighbours.

In 1993, the BCCI signed a deal with TransWorld International (TWI), which would pay the BCCI to televise England's tour of India on satellite television and Doordarshan would pay TWI for the rights to televise the matches in India. The 1993 Hero Cup was broadcast on Star TV, which made it the first cricket series to be broadcast on satellite television in India and broke the monopoly of Doordarshan. A lengthy legal battle between Doordarshan and the BCCI—which was led by Jagmohan Dalmiya and president I. S. Bindra—ensued. In February 1995, the Supreme Court of India ruled the television rights of India's matches were a commodity belonging to the BCCI, for which the broadcaster must pay BCCI and not the other way around.

BCCI, in a joint bid with Pakistan and Sri Lanka, won the rights to host the 1996 Cricket World Cup, defeating the England-and-Australia bloc. The tournament was a commercial success, yielding the ICC a profit of $50 million.

In 1997, Dalmiya became the president of the ICC. With Dalmiya at the head of the ICC, the BCCI led a successful proposal to grant Test status to Bangladesh in 1999–2000.

21st century

Since 2000, the BCCI has hosted and organised multiple ICC cricket World Cup competitions in 2011, 2016, 2021, ICC Men's Cricket World Cups, 2013, 2016 Women's Cricket world cups.

In 2007, the BCCI established the Indian Premier League (IPL), an annual, franchise-based, Twenty20 cricket league. In 2008, the BCCI sold the ownership of eight city-based franchises to corporate groups and Bollywood celebrities in a closed auction for a total of 723.49 million; it also sold the tournament's global media rights for 10 years to World Sport Group for 1.03 billion. The media deal was re-negotiated the following year to $1.6 billion. In 2010, the BCCI expanded the league to 10 teams, selling two new franchises for a total of 703 million. Due to the IPL's commercial success, similarly styled Twenty20 leagues appeared around the world, as did franchise-based leagues in other sports in India. 

In 2019, the BCCI recognised retired players' union the Indian Cricketers Association (ICA), which was formed after the Lodha committee's recommendation to form a indipendent organisation for welfare of nation's players. The BCCI also includes this union's representative in its and the IPL's governing apex council.

On 14 February 2022, BCCI began constructing a new National Cricket Academy (NCA) at Bengaluru.

Women's cricket 

India women's national cricket team represents India in Women's international cricket. It played its first Women's Cricket World Cup in 1978, when it was first held in India. Diana Edulji was the first captain of the Indian women's cricket team in One Day Internationals (ODIs). The Indian womens' team have played in the finals of the 2005 and 2017  World Cup competitions in South Africa and in England, respectively.

Womens' Cricket World Cup tournaments in 1978, 1997 and 2013 were held in India.

In 2007, the governing body of women's cricket in India the Women's Cricket Association of India was merged into the BCCI after the International Women's Cricket Council merged into ICC in 2006.
 
On 28 October 2022, BCCI secretary Jay Shah announced it would pay equal sums of money to women's team players as it pays to men's team's players.

Inspiration to start this league came from the IPL. The first season will be played in 2023. 

On 30 January 2023, India U19 women's team won their inaugural T20 World Cup, defeating England in the final.

Indian Premier League 

In 2008, the BCCI launched its Twenty20 cricket league franchise the Indian Premier League (IPL), which has grown to become the world's most-lucrative cricket league, attracting many of the world's top players. It is one of the biggest sports leagues in the world. The IPL is the BCCI's major revenue source and is the only league to have a special window in ICC Future Tours Programme (ICC FTP), meaning very little international cricket is organised during the tournament.

Controversies

From 2008, the BCCI banned Pakistani players from playing in the IPL due to Pakistan's involvement in 2008 Mumbai terrorist attacks, in which terrorist attack by Pakistan-trained terrorists killed 166 people died and injured 238. The attacks angered Indians. In 2012, the BCCI advised its IPL franchises not to buy any Pakistani players. It was wary of several issues; their off-field misdemeanours and spot-fixing allegations against them.

From 2012, BCCI opposed holding any bilateral series with the Pakistan Cricket Board (PCB). India plays against Pakistan only in ICC and ACC multinational events. Many times, the PCB urged BCCI to play bilateral series but BCCI rejected them. According to the BCCI, India cannot not play bilateral series against Pakistan without the Government of India's permission. According to the Indian government, Pakistan  sponsors, harbours and supports terrorist organisations, and trains terrorists. In 2017, the Sports Minister of India, Vijay Goel said Pakistan should first stop sponsoring terrorists.

BCCI pays 10 percent from the salary of every foreign player to their respective national board. In 2022, the Australian Cricketers' Association expressed their unhappiness about these payments.

Allegations, controversies and irregularities

Conflicts of interest 

The BCCI's former president N. Srinivasan was criticised for his alleged biased behaviour towards some state boards by awarding them ODI, Test and T20 matches while in office, possibly in violation of the board's rotation policy on venues.

During Srinivasan's tenure as its treasurer, the BCCI constitution was amended to allow him to buy a franchise through his company India Cements during the 2008 IPL Team Auction. Srinivasan courted further controversy for appointing India and Chennai Super Kings captain Mahendra Singh Dhoni as a vice-president of India Cements. Srinivasan's son-in-law Gurunath Meiyappan, who was also closely associated with Chennai Super Kings, was arrested for alleged involvement in Spot-fixing and betting. Then-BCCI-unrecognised state association Bihar Cricket Association (BCA) filed a petition against the BCCI for mismanagement and conflict of interest in its investigation of 2013 IPL corruption scandal. In 2013, Mumbai police arrested the Indian cricket team's regular player S. Sreesanth, other players and  IPL team owners of Chennai Super Kings and Rajasthan Royals for their dealings with the illegal betting industry. In 2015, the Supreme Court appointed the Lodha Committee and suspended Chennai Super Kings from the IPL for two years, and suspended Meiyappan from cricket activities for life. In 2013, Rupa Gurunath—N Shrinivasan's daughter and Gurunath Meiyappan's wife—who was then president of Tamil Nadu Cricket Association, was found guilty of conflict of interest by the BCCI's ethics officer Justice D.K. Jain. In 2015, the Supreme Court of India barred Srinivasan from the BCCI for contesting elections due to his conflict of interest; the court also struck down the amendments of BCCI constitution that had allowed him to own and operate an IPL team.

The BCCI does not allow its contracted, non-contracted, national and domestic players to participate in any cricket leagues abroad. Only players who have retired from all formats of Indian cricket can take part in foreign leagues. Players such as Adam Gilchrist have questioned this policy. Indian players such as Suresh Raina and Robin Uthappa have urged the board to allow non-contracted players like them to participate in foreign leagues.

Tax issues
Many times BCCI avoided paying government taxes. Once it claimed that it is a "charitable organisation" to avoide tax. It often brand itself as a Non government organisation (NGO). In 2014, India's ministry of finance revealed that, there were as many as 213 cases of tax envisions by BCCI/IPL from 2009-10 to 2014, which involving 261.64 Cr rupees. Till 2012, BCCI got exemption from tax under IT Act 1961 (section 11) but later Income tax department declared BCCI'S earnings as commercial and listed them as business income. Whenever ICC organise a international event such as world cup in India, it ask BCCI to get tax exemptions from its government. During 2016 T20 world cup, Modi government gave them 10% exemption. According to Deccan Herald article on 19 December 2021, even though BCCI is one of the worlds' richest sports body and earns thousands of crore rupees per year, it shows unwillingness to pay income tax and finds loopholes in law to avoid paying taxes.

Politicians on the board 

Politicians from multiple political parties have held positions within BCCI; Sharad Pawar of the Nationalist Congress Party, Madhavrao Scindia of the Indian National Congress and Anurag Thakur of Bhartiya Janata Party (BJP) were BCCI presidents, latter's brother Arun Singh Dhumal is the IPL chairman. As of 18 October 2022, Jay Shah, the son of the Home Minister of India Amit Shah, is BCCI's secretary. Rajiv Shukla of the Congress party who is associated with the BCCI from more than a decade is its vice-president and Ashish Shelar of BJP is its treasurer.

Reforms: 2017 Committee of Administrators 

The BCCI has been criticised for its monopolistic practices, and has suffered from allegations of corruption and cronyism.  On 30 January 2017, The Supreme Court of India nominated a four-member Committee of Administrators composed of Vinod Rai, Ramachandra Guha, Vikram Limaye and Diana Edulji to administer the BCCI to implement Lodha Committee reforms. Vinod Rai, a retired civil servant and the former Comptroller and Auditor General of India, led the committee, which administered the board until elections could be conducted.

The BCCI had consistently opposed its regulation by the National Anti-Doping Agency (NADA). On 9 August 2019, the BCCI agreed to adhere to the anti-doping mechanisms governed by the NADA.

Rebel league
The rebel league the Indian Cricket League (ICL) was owned and operated by Essel Group. BCCI banned Indian players who played in the ICL, including Hemang Badani, Dinesh Mongia, Rohan Gavaskar and Ambati Rayudu, but later gave amnesty to these players and lifted theirs bans after they ended their ties with the ICL. The BCCI blacklisted Essel Group company Zee Entertainment Enterprises due to this league, and expelled it from the BCCI in 2021. Zee was prohibited from buying BCCI's media rights. In 2006, the BCCI sold the Indian cricket team's media rights to Zee for the 2006-11 period but after Essel Group initiated the ICL, the BCCI terminated this deal. Zee fought a long legal battle with the BCCI; on 12 March 2018, a tribunal headed by three judges found BCCI guilty and asked them to pay Zee  for losses. The tribunal found blacklisting of Zee by BCCI was illegal and said in judgement; "To us it seems that BCCI was exploiting its dominating position in respect of game of cricket in India" and also added Zee and its affiliated companies to the blacklist and banning them from participating in the BCCI bidding process was illegal.

Virat Kohli sacking
In 2021 BCCI sacked Virat Kohli from ODI captaincy, then President Ganguly told media that we asked him to remain captain but he said he does not want. After that Kohli took a press conference and revealed that BCCI did not tell him to remain captain. In February 2023, in a sting operation by a news agency, chief-selector Chetan Sharma, revealed that actually Kohli was lying and in fact Ganguly had told him to remain as captain in the meeting in front of all the selectors. According to him Virat Kohli was considering himself bigger than BCCI and wanted to teach a lesson to the President of BCCI. He also revealed that after Kohli resigned from T20 captaincy, BCCI decided to sack him from ODI captaincy also because they did not wanted two separate captains for limited overs format. 

Sharma also alleged that lots of Indian players take injections to expedite their return in national team despite being 80 to 85% fit. After few days Sharma resigned from his post.

Organisation

Constitution
The BCCI is governed by its constitution. The board has been prohibited by the Supreme Court of India from amending its own constitution without its approval.

Headquarters 
The BCCI's headquarters is located at the Cricket Centre within the premises of the Mumbai Cricket Association at Wankhede Stadium in Churchgate, Mumbai, where it occupies three floors of a four-floor building.

Legal status
According to the BCCI, it is an autonomous body and does not receive any grants or funding from the Indian government. In 2004, in the Supreme Court of India, the BCCI's lawyers said the Indian cricket team is "the official team of BCCI and not the official team of India". The lawyers also said the BCCI "do not even fly the national flag" and that it never "uses any national emblem in the activities of the Board". The BCCI recommends its players for prestigious awards such as the Arjuna award but says it is not a national sports federation.  From its foundation, the BCCI has not been sanctioned by Government of India; it started as governing body of cricket in India and as a representative of India. The BCCI is alleged to use British Raj emblem without prior permission from Government of India and its
offence under the Emblem and Names (Prevention of Improper Use) Act, 1950.

Logo
The BCCI's logo is derived from the Star of India emblem. According to Information Commissioner Sridhar Acharyulu, the logo was designed by the British Raj in 1928. It is 90% similar to the Star of India.

Anti-Corruption Unit 
The BCCI has a special anti-corruption unit that is responsible for preventing malpractice in cricket within India. This unit is responsible for investigating unlawful activities such as betting, spot-fixing, match-fixing and corrupt approaches to players. Shabir Hussein has been the head of this unit since April 2021 .

Ethics officer 
Former Indian Supreme Court judge Vineet Saran is the BCCI's incumbent ethics officer and ombudsman. He was appointed in June 2022. The board created this ethics officer post in 2017 due to increasing complaints of conflict of interest in the board's office holders, employees and associated people. The officer reviews complaints of conflict of interest.

Anti-Doping unit
Dr. Abhijit Salvi is the head of BCCI's anti doping unit. NADA sends qualified doctors to collect blood and urine sample of players and later analyse it in lab to find out performance enhancing drugs or steroids in blood. After that BCCI takes appropriate actions if found doing violations.

Affiliated members

Membership of the Board of Control for Cricket in India consists of full members and associate members; only full members have voting rights in annual general meetings (AGMs).

Following the Lodha Committee's recommendations in 2015, full membership was restricted to state and union territory associations, and limited to one representative body per state. Subsequently, several state associations became full members and, because the states of Gujarat and Maharashtra each had three members, Mumbai, Baroda, Saurashtra and Vidharbh were relegated to associate membership. Neither the Cricket Club of India of Mumbai nor the National Cricket Club of Kolkata field teams in major domestic tournaments but as founding members of BCCI, they had full voting rights until the Lodha Committee recommendations were implemented. Some of the recommendations that were implemented have since been reversed. In 2018, Railways, Services and Universities regained full membership; and in 2022, the rule restricting states to a single full member was removed, meaning Mumbai, Baroda, Saurashtra and Vidharbh once again became full members.

Officials

President 

President is an elected position, and is considered the most-powerful position in the BCCI administration. Due to the president's financial power and the popularity of cricket in India, it is considered as a highly prestigious position. The President of the BCCI presides over the meeting of the apex council and the general body. He signs audited annual accounts and financial statements.

The full-member state boards can vote in the presidential election. Gujarat and Maharashtra have more than one full member but as per the Lodha Committee, supreme court guidelines state any state can have only one vote in the election at any time.

Former India-and-Karnataka cricketer, national selector, India under-19 teams' coach and President of the Karnataka State Cricket Association Roger Binny is the incumbent President of the BCCI. He succeeded Sourav Ganguly. Binny is a member of India's 1983 Cricket World Cup-winning team. He took charge in October 2022.

Secretary
'BCCI secretary' is the second most powerful and important post after president. Secretary signs all the contracts and carries correspondence on behalf of BCCI. Jay Shah is the incumbent secretary. The secretary have power to take action or defend office bearers, employees of the board.

CEO
As per the eligibility criteria, the person who has at least 10 years of working experience in a -or-more annual turnover company on management position can be a Chief Executive Officer (CEO) of the BCCI. Hemang Amin is the incumbent CEO. Rahul Johari became the first CEO; the post was created after the recommendation of the Lodha Committee. The CEO of the BCCI handles its management duties and reports to the BCCI secretary.

National selectors 

National selectors are responsible for selecting national men's senior team.. It also select male junior teams India A and India B, which represent India in second-and-third tiers of international cricket. The selection committee is composed of five former cricketers from five different zones of the country, Shivasundar Das, Sridharan Sharath, Salil Ankola and Subroto Banerjee are its present members. Chief selector's position is vacant as of 17 February 2023 BCCI's junior national selection committee selects players for junior teams such as India U19 and U15 men. Sharath Sridharan is its chairman since 17 September 2021. 

BCCI gives chief national selector 1.25 Cr rupees per year for his job. 

The All India women's selection committee selects players for Indian female cricket team. It consists of five female former players from five zones of the nation, who have represented India at international level. , former left-arm spinner Neetu David is the head of this committee since her appointment on 26 September 2020. The committee consists of Neetu David (head), Aarti Vaidya, Renu Margrate, Mithu Mukharjee, Venkatechar Kalpana.

Domestic tournaments 

The BCCI organise following national-level tournaments :

Men's domestic cricket 

 Ranji Trophy 
 Vijay Hazare Trophy
 Syed Mushtaq Ali Trophy
 Indian Premier League (IPL)
 Duleep Trophy
 Deodhar Trophy
 Irani Cup 
 CK Nayudu Trophy
 NKP Salve Challenger Trophy
 Under 25 State A Trophy (One Day format)

Women's domestic cricket 

 Women's Senior One Day Trophy
 Women's Senior T20 Trophy
 Women's Premier League (WPL)
 Senior Women's Challenger Trophy
 Senior Women's T20 Challenger Cup
 Senior Women's Inter zonal tournament (T20 format) 
  Senior Women's Inter-zonal One Day

Women's junior tournaments

 Women's Under 19 T20 Challenger Trophy  (India A, B, C and D teams participate)
 Women's under 19 T20 trophy
 Women's under 19 One Day Trophy  
 U-16 one day tournament 
 Women's under 15 One Day Trophy

Men's Junior cricket tournaments

 Cooch Behar Trophy (U-19, 4 day format) 
 Vinoo Mankad Trophy (U-19, One Day format)  
 Vijay Merchant Trophy (U-16)  
 Vizzy Trophy (List-A format)

Finances

Television production 
In 2012, the BCCI established its own production house. The BCCI's broadcast service produces coverage of international matches of the Indian national cricket team in India; and matches of leading domestic championships and the IPL.  Untl 2012, the BCCI paid the production costs of the company that held the media rights. Nimbus Communications did production for the BCCI for some years. BCCI's production house holds production rights and copyrights of Indian cricket. The BCCI broadcasts video highlights of domestic and bilateral cricket series in India on its website.

Earnings and influence

Finances
The BCCI is a private entity; it does not depend on the Government of India for its finances. In 2020, with US$405 million out of US$1,534 million, India had 26% share in the ICC FTP income disbursed to 10 Test playing nations, while the England and Wales Cricket Board received US$139 million as the second-highest earner. In the same year, to refinance other boards after the global economic decline and the significantly reduced income of most boards due to the COVID-19 pandemic, the ICC changed its FTP schedule to organise more international matches with India.

Influence in the cricketing world
The BCCI is regarded as cricket's big economic player.  In 2009, the ICC and BCCI were in disagreement over the World Anti Doping Agency (WADA) "whereabouts" clause.

Income

ICC income share 
In 2020, as per the present eight-year Future Tours Program (FTP), India receives US$405 million from the ICC, as contrasted with US$139 million to the England and Wales Cricket Board, while US$128 million for each of Cricket Australia, Cricket South Africa, Pakistan Cricket Board, New Zealand Cricket, Sri Lanka Cricket, Cricket West Indies and Bangladesh Cricket Board, and US$94 million for Zimbabwe.

Media rights 

In 2018, satellite broadcaster Star India won the BCCI's exclusive media rights for the years 2018–2023.

The deal also include rights to broadcast men's domestic tournaments such as the Vijay Hazare Trophy, Ranji Trophy, Irani Cup, Duleep Trophy and Mushtaq Ali Trophy; and women's international cricket matches in India on Star Sport and Disney+ Hotstar.

The IPL is the BCCI's largest source of income by medium of media rights. This deal includes 410 matches from 2023 to 2027. Viacom 18 won the exclusive digital rights for the Indian subcontinent and for streaming to the UK, Australia, New Zealand and South Africa; while Times Internet won global streaming rights in the Middle East, North Africa and the United States. Due to this deal, the IPL became the second-richest league in the world behind National Football League (NFL).

Sponsorship rights 
Star India is the official broadcaster of BCCI. Killer is kit sponsor, Byju's is team sponsor, Mastercard is title sponsor for all the bilateral series in India and for all domestic championships. Dream 11, Ambuja and Hyundai are official partners.

Ticketing rights 

BCCI sold IPL 2022 ticket-selling rights to BookMyShow. The deal includes management of spectator entry on stadium gates. Paytm insider app also often sells bilateral series's tickets.

Expenditure

Cricketing infrastructure development 

On 12 September 2006, the BCCI announced it would spend  over the next year to upgrade cricket stadia in India.

In the early 2000s, it established the National Cricket Academy at Bangalore train future cricketers. On 17 February 2022, the BCCI president Sourav Ganguly founded a new NCA facility at Bangalore, which occupies  of land near an airport. On completion, it will have three cricket grounds, 40 practice pitches, residential rooms, a swimming pool and a gymnasium. Construction will cost .

Donations
In March 2020, BCCI President Sourav Ganguly donated  to the PM CARES Fund to combat the COVID-19 pandemic. The BCCI to donate 2,000  oxygen concentrators to help India fight COVID-19.

Encouragement to other sports 
 It announced reward to the Indian olympians who won medal at Tokyo Olympics.

Players' contracts and welfare

Contracts 
The BCCI created four grades for contracted male players—A+, A, B andC; and three grades for contracted female players—A, B and C. Male players who are in A+ grade get  a year. Female players who are in A grade get  a year, B-grade players get  a year and C-grade players get  a year.

Pension schemes 
The BCCI gives pensions to former domestic and international players who played for India. On 31 December 1993 BCCI decided to give 50,000 rupees pension to the players, who played more than 25 International Test match for the nation. The board gives  pensions to the players who played in the Ranji Trophy before the 1957-to-1958 season. In 2013, the BCCI gave one-time benefits to domestic players who played in more than 75 first-class matches.

Insurance 
The BCCI has taken insurance for nearly everything related to them; they covered mediclaim of their employees, they have insured international and domestic players for loss of fees due to injury, matches, their old office and new office at Wankhede stadium and IPL matches. In case of cancellation of IPL, domestic and international cricket matches due to poor weather, riot, or fire, the BCCI receives payments from insurance companies. The BCCI provides  insurance to players who played under the board.

Taxation payments 

In 2018,  of tax  was outstanding on 1 April 2018; this sum was cleared along with interest in September 2018 but the Department of Revenue issued a notice for tax evasion to the BCCI.

In 2012, BCCI paid no taxes on its income, claiming exemption as a charitable organisation.

In popular culture 

 The BCCI is featured in the Jersey, a 2019 Telugu language film in which the main protagonist Arjun (Nani) aspires to play for the India national cricket team and in the Ranji Trophy. 
 This organisation is mentioned in M.S. Dhoni: The Untold Story (2016) Bollywood film.

See also
 Cricket in India
 BCCI Awards 
 Sport in India  – Overview of sport in India 
 List of national level sport governing bodies in India

Explanatory notes

References

External links 
 Official Website 
 
 

Cricket administration in India
Cricket
1928 establishments in India
Sports organizations established in 1928
Members of the Board of Control for Cricket in India
Organisations based in Mumbai